Franco Zucchi (22 November 1917 – 24 February 1996) was an Italian sailor who competed in the 1960 Summer Olympics.

References

1917 births
1996 deaths
Italian male sailors (sport)
Olympic sailors of Italy
Sailors at the 1960 Summer Olympics – 5.5 Metre